Freedom is a London-based anarchist website and biannual journal published by Freedom Press which was formerly either a monthly, a fortnightly or a weekly newspaper.

The paper was started in 1886 by volunteers including Peter Kropotkin and Charlotte Wilson and continued with a short interruption in the 1930s until 2014 as a regular publication, moving its news production online and publishing irregularly until 2016, when it became a bi-annual. Originally, the subtitle was "A Journal of Anarchist Socialism". The title was changed to "A Journal of Anarchist Communism" in June 1889. Currently it's labelled simply as an "Anarchist Journal". The newspaper's mission statement was originally stated in every issue and summarises the writers' view of anarchism:

The current printed issue does not carry a summary, but the website retains a section of the original 1886 introductory essay by Peter Kropotkin:

History 

The paper historically featured news from the peace and labour movements and events as well as listing planned events and protests. Staying true to Kropotkin's principle of mutual aid, the paper regularly featured reviews of other anarchist and libertarian socialist publications, such as Organise! and Direct Action as well as other local and international newsletters and journals.

In 2006, the paper gained a colour front for the first time in its history. Along with a number of gradual changes in the content and structure of the paper and organisational changes at Freedom Press, Freedom got a re-design in January 2008. While remaining a fortnightly newspaper, it doubled the number of pages to 16 and reduced to A4 in size, introducing a basic theory section, dedicated business and public sector pages and an increased story count. In late 2011, it switched from fortnightly to monthly publication, which continued until its closure as a regular paper in 2014. It cost £2 per issue.

Editors 
Note that this is a non-comprehensive list:
 1886–1895: Charlotte Wilson
 1895–1910: Alfred Marsh
 1910–1928: Thomas Keell
 1930–1934: John Turner
 1930–1936: John Humphrey 
 1936–1949: Marie Louise Berneri
 1936–1968: Vernon Richards
 1940–1960: Colin Ward (joint)
 1964–1969: John Rety
 1970: Peter Turner, Jack Robinson and Bill Christopher
 1970s: John Lawrence, Donald Rooum
 1970s–1980s: Stu Stuart, Vernon Richards 
 1976–1980s: David Peers
 1980s: Gillian Fleming
 1990s–2001: Charles Crute
 2001–2004: Toby Crow 
 2003–2004: Steven, Jim Clarke 
 2004–2009: Rob Ray 
 2009–2013: Dean Talent 
 2012–2013: Matt Black
 2013–2014: Charlotte Dingle

2014 print closure 
On 1 March 2014, Freedom announced the closure of its print edition, continuing to publish online alongside a bi-annual printed freesheet. This was expanded into a 20-page journal from 2016. Frequency dropped to one issue per year during the 2020-2021 Covid pandemic.

Related publications 
Spain and the World was an anarchist publication founded in 1936 by Vernon Richards with former Freedom writers, which had effectively ceased publication in 1932. The intention was to provide an English-language publication to support Spanish anarchists who were at that time achieving a measure of political influence through the anarchist trade union Confederación Nacional del Trabajo (CNT) and other organisations. Spain and the World had several notable contributors, including Emma Goldman, Herbert Read, Ethel Mannin and John Cowper Powys.

Between the end of the Spanish Civil War and the outbreak of World War II, the fortnightly Spain and the World briefly became Revolt! in 1939 before adopting the title War Commentary. In 1945, War Commentary resumed the title of Freedom.

In 1944, Richards, his wife Marie-Louise Berneri and two others associated with the paper (Philip Sansom and John Hewetson) were charged with conspiring to cause disaffection among members of the armed forces. Despite a defence campaign backed by the likes of George Orwell, Michael Tippett, T. S. Eliot and Benjamin Britten, Vernon, Sansom and Hewetson were convicted and served nine months in jail.

Freedom Press compiled a selection of articles from Freedom in the 1991 book The State Is Your Enemy.

Related pages 
 List of anarchist periodicals
 The Raven: Anarchist Quarterly

Notes

Further reading

External links 
 
 Freedom Press Newspaper Archive

Anarchist newspapers
Anarcho-communism
Monthly newspapers
Publications established in 1886
Peter Kropotkin
Political newspapers published in the United Kingdom
1886 establishments in the United Kingdom